Sir John Swinton, 14th of that Ilk, great-grandson of Henry de Swinton who appears on the Ragman Roll, was a distinguished soldier and statesman in the reigns of Robert II of Scotland and Robert III of Scotland. (See Clan Swinton)

France, Hundred Years War

He was one of the greatest fighters of his time. In youth, the Borders being too quiet for him, he had signed on with John of Gaunt, 1st Duke of Lancaster. He made an interesting agreement with John of Gaunt which included the following among other terms:

a) Swinton was not to be required to fight against his own country.
b) He was to be given double pay, and free transport for himself, his horses and his men.
c) The Duke was to replace any of his horses that were lost or taken. In return, he was to have one-third share in the ransom of Swinton’s future prisoners and in his other "profits of war".

This unusual "contract" shows that Sir John must already have acquired a solid reputation as a fighter, perhaps in Prussia or Spain or even both, some time before 1371, when it was made.

Sir John fully justified the trust placed in him, through his conduct in a series of campaigns and particularly at Noyon (between Amiens and Paris) when he fought his way single-handed into the town. Legend says he was the hero who, according to Jean Froissart, leaped the barrier gates at Noyon and for love of the fray fought the chivalry of France for more than an hour "alone against them all" - "giving many grand strokes with his lance." When the army began to move and he had to rejoin it, he cleared the way with a thrust or two, sprang back, and mounting, with his page in front, cried : "Adieu, adieu, Seigneurs, grands mercis!" and spurred away.

About this time, he married a young wife, Joan, who died without children and whose jewels were stolen by Alice Perrers, Edward III’s mistress (who also stole the King’s rings from his fingers as he lay dying). He appealed to the King for their return, but they could not be traced, and it is not altogether surprising that he returned to Scotland soon after.

Battle of Otterburn

He was a commander at the Battle of Otterburn in July 1388 when the Scots won the day and defeated the English, although their leader, the Earl of Douglas, was slain. The Scotichronicon, talking of the battle, mentions "a very experienced, strong, and brave Scot", John Swinton, who carved a path through the English: "Because of this the Scots were able to penetrate the English line with their spears, so that the English were forced to give ground to this strong force".

It is related of Sir John, that in the wars with the English, he visited the enemy's camp, and gave a general challenge to fight any of their army.

Appointments

He was appointed one of the ambassadors extraordinary by King Robert III to negotiate a treaty with the court of England, for which they got a safe conduct from King Richard II for themselves and sixty knights in their retinue, 4 July 1392. He was afterwards employed upon another negotiation, and obtained a safe conduct from King Henry IV to go to England, with twenty horsemen in his retinue, 7 July 1400.

Battle of Homildon Hill

The gallant bearing and heroic death of the Lord of Swinton, at the fatal battle of Homildon on 14 September 1402, have afforded a subject for the poetic genius of Scott, and are the materials on which he founded the drama of "Haledon Hill". Pinkerton thus records Swinton's fall:

"The English advanced to the assault, and Henry Percy was about to lead them up the hill, when March caught his bridle, and advised him to advance no farther, but to pour the dreadful shower of English arrows into the enemy. This advice was followed with the usual fortune; for in all ages the bow was the English weapon of victory, and though the Scots, and perhaps the French, were superior in the use of the spear, yet this weapon was useless after the distant bow had decided the combat. Robert the Great, sensible of this at the battle of Bannockburn, ordered a prepared detachment of cavalry to rush among the English archers at the commencement, totally to disperse them, and stop the deadly effusion. But Douglas now used no such precaution; and the consequence was, that his people, drawn up on the face of the hill, presented one general mark to the enemy, none of whose arrows descended in vain. The Scots fell without fight and unrevenged, till a spirited knight, Swinton, exclaimed aloud, "O my brave countrymen! what fascination has seized you to-day, that you stand like deer to be shot, instead of indulging your ancient courage, and meeting your enemies hand to hand? Let those who will, descend with me, that we may gain victory, and life, or fall like men." This being heard by Adam Gordon, between whom and Swinton there existed a deadly feud, attended with the mutual slaughter of many followers, he instantly fell on his knees before Swinton, begged his pardon, and desired to be dubbed a knight by him whom he must now regard as the wisest and boldest of that order in Britain. The ceremony performed, Swinton and Gordon descended the hill, accompanied by only one hundred men, and a desperate valour led the whole body to death. Had a similar spirit been shewn by the Scottish army, it is probable that the event of that day would have been different."

Family life

Swinton's second wife was the Countess of Douglas and Mar, but they had no offspring. His third wife was Princess Margaret, daughter of Robert Stewart, Duke of Albany who served as Regent from 1406 to 1419. The Princess bore Swinton a son, later Sir John Swinton of Swinton, reckoned to be the fifteenth Lord of the name.

See also

Clan Swinton

References

14th-century Scottish people